Moshkan (also Romanized as Moshkān; also known as Moshgān and Mūsh Kān) is a village in Qeshlaq Rural District, in the Central District of Khorrambid County, Fars Province, Iran. At the 2006 census, its population was 1,063, in 240 families.

References 

Populated places in Khorrambid County